James Lawrence Radford (September 15, 1856 – October 22, 1901) was an American politician who served in the Virginia House of Delegates.

References

External links 

1856 births
1901 deaths
Democratic Party members of the Virginia House of Delegates
19th-century American politicians